is a Japanese politician who served as Chief Cabinet Secretary to Prime Minister Shinzō Abe until August 2007.


Early career 

Born in Matsuyama, Ehime Prefecture, he was an AFS exchange student in high school, graduated with a liberal arts degree from the University of Tokyo and attended the John F. Kennedy School of Government at Harvard University. He spent three years working at the Economic Planning Agency (of which his father, Jun Shiozaki, was then director) and at the Bank of Japan. He then worked as a secretary to his father.

National Diet 
Following his father's resignation, he ran for the Diet in 1993 and was elected to represent the first district of Ehime. He served as Vice Minister of Foreign Affairs in the 2005 cabinet of Junichiro Koizumi and was appointed Chief Cabinet Secretary on September 26, 2006, and held the position until a cabinet shuffle at the end of August 2007.

His appointment as Minister of Health, Labor and Welfare in the second Abe administration was announced on September 3, 2014.

Shiozaki's profile on the LDP website:
Bank of Japan
Parliamentary Vice－Minister of Finance (Hashimoto Cabinet)
Senior Vice-Minister for Foreign Affairs (Koizumi Cabinet)
Chief Cabinet Secretary (Abe Cabinet)
Minister of State for Abduction issue (AbeCabinet)
Acting Chairman, Policy Research Council

Political positions
Like most member of Shinzo Abe's Cabinet, Shiozaki is affiliated to the openly revisionist organization Nippon Kaigi. He also is a member of the following right-wing group at the Diet:
Japan Rebirth (創生「日本」 Sōsei Nippon)
Nippon Kaigi Diet discussion group (日本会議国会議員懇談会 Nippon kaigi kokkai giin kondankai)
Conference of parliamentarians on the Shinto Association of Spiritual Leadership (神道政治連盟国会議員懇談会) - NB: SAS a.k.a. Sinseiren, Shinto Political League, Shinto Seiji Renmei Kokkai Giin Kondankai

Shiozaki gave the following answers to the questionnaire submitted by Mainichi to parliamentarians in 2012:
no answer regarding the revision of the Constitution
in favor of the right of collective self-defense (revision of Article 9)
no answer regarding the reform of the National assembly (unicameral instead of bicameral)
in favor of reactivating nuclear power plants
against the goal of zero nuclear power by 2030s
in favor of the relocation of Marine Corps Air Station Futenma (Okinawa)
in favor of evaluating the purchase of Senkaku Islands by the Government
in favor of a strong attitude versus China
no answer regarding the participation of Japan to the Trans-Pacific Partnership
no answer regarding a nuclear-armed Japan
no answer regarding the reform of the Imperial Household that would allow women to retain their Imperial status even after marriage

On October 17, 2014, Shiozaki sent an offering ('masakaki) to the controversial Yasukuni shrine.

Honours
In July 2022, he was awarded as Honorary Member of the Order of the British Empire (MBE), for services to UK/Japan relations.

References

Living people
1950 births
Harvard Kennedy School alumni
University of Tokyo alumni
People from Matsuyama, Ehime
Economic planning ministers of Japan
Government ministers of Japan
Members of Nippon Kaigi
Ministers of Health, Labour and Welfare of Japan
21st-century Japanese politicians
Honorary Members of the Order of the British Empire